The 100 Marathon Club is a club for marathon and ultra marathon runners. It has a membership that is primarily based in the UK, but with additional members from outside Britain.

The 100 Marathon Club is affiliated to UK Athletics.

Membership 
The 100 Marathon Club has two types of membership: full and associate.

Full membership is available to anyone who has run and completed at least 100 marathons or Ultra Marathons (ultras), whereas for associate membership, a runner only needs to have run at least 50 marathons or Ultras.

Other 100 Marathon Clubs 
There are other 100 Marathon Clubs outside the UK, unconnected with the British one, including:
 100 Marathon Club Austria
 100 Marathon Club Australia
 100 Marathon Club Danmark
 100 Marathon Club Deutschland e.V.
 100 Marathon Club Dutch
 100 Marathon Club Czech
 100 Marathons Club Estonia
 100 Marathon Club Finland
 100 Marathons Club France
 100 Marathons Club Japan
 100 Marathons Club Ireland
 100 Marathons Club Italy
 100 Marathon Club The Netherlands
 100 Marathon Club North America
 100 Marathon Club Norway
 100 Marathon Club Russia
 100 Marathon Club Schweiz
 100 Marathons Club Serbia
 100 Marathons Club Slovakia
 100 Marathons Club Sweden
 100 Marathons Club Taiwan
 100 Marathon Club Poland

References

External links 

 Official site

Running clubs in the United Kingdom